Paradigm shift is a term to describe a change in basic assumptions within the ruling theory of science.

Paradigm Shift may also refer to:
 Paradigm Shift (album), a 1997 album by various artists
 The Paradigm Shift, a 2013 album by Korn
 "Paradigm Shift", a song by Candiria on the 1997 album Beyond Reasonable Doubt and 2002 album The C.O.M.A. Imprint
 "Paradigm Shift", a song by Liquid Tension Experiment on the 1998 album Liquid Tension Experiment
 Paradigm Shift, a book by Martin Cohen
 Paradigm Shift, a book by Zalman Schachter-Shalomi, and his theology
 2070 Paradigm Shift, a satirical speech given by internet comedian Sam Hyde
 Paradigm Shift, the finishing maneuver of professional wrestler Jon Moxley

See also
 Paradigm (disambiguation)